Rrok Gjonlleshaj (born 10 February 1961) is a Montenegrin Albanian prelate of the Catholic Church who serves as the Archbishop of Bar from 2016 and the apostolic administrator of Kotor since 2023, a post he also held from 2019 to 2021.

Life 

After the end of his elementary studies in his native city, Rrok Gjonlleshaj studied philosophy and theology in Rijeka and received on 1 August 1987, the sacrament of Holy Orders for the Apostolic Administration of Prizren. He then worked in several parishes as a vicar and after as a pastor, most of them in Pristina. Gjonlleshaj was parish priest of the St. Anthony parish in Pristina as well as treasurer of the Apostolic Administration of Prizren. He was also the director of Radio Marija in Albanian and a contributor to the Drita religious-cultural show. On 5 April 2016 he was appointed by Pope Francis as Archbishop of Bar. His episcopal ordination was performed by his predecessor Zef Gashi, SDB on 14 May of the same year and the co-consecrators were the Apostolic Nuncio in Slovenia, Archbishop Juliusz Janusz, and the Apostolic Administrator of Prizren, Dodë Gjergji.

References 

1961 births
21st-century Roman Catholic archbishops in Montenegro
Kosovan Roman Catholic bishops
Kosovan people of Albanian descent
Living people
Archbishops of Antivari
Montenegrin Roman Catholic archbishops